= World Cycling Day =

World Cycling Day (also known as WCD) is held annually on the 17th of September internationally. Its inception as the first global cycling cultural festival was celebrated in 2017, the year coincides with the 200th anniversary of the birth of bicycles.

== Background ==
The WCD is celebrated on Sep 17 annually, as the number “917” is the Chinese homonym of “Just Cycle”. On this day, the organizers appeal and advocate that citizens should pay close attention to cities’ sustainable development; take actions to reduce traffic congestion and air pollution by cycling instead of driving; feel and love the cities through riding bicycles, and make the cities a better place.

== Themes ==
=== 2017 - “Cycling Changes Cities” ===
The theme for WCD 2017 is “Cycling Changes Cities”. During the event, besides encouraging the users to travel by bicycles and promoting green travel, Mobike works with various organizations and business partners, user communities in more than 170 cities worldwide to organize rich online and offline activities, giving out various awards and virtual medals through its APP to encourage and attract more people to travel by bicycles in order to contribute to a low carbon, green and healthy city, and a pollution free earth.

== Associated Events ==
Many international cities such as Singapore, London, Manchester, Florence, and Sapporo have participated actively in 2017’s WCD events, together with cities in China, to boost green and shared travels.
